Nie Rongzhen (December 29, 1899 – May 14, 1992) was a prominent Chinese Communist military leader, and one of ten Marshals in the People's Liberation Army of China. He was the last surviving PLA officer with the rank of Marshal.

Biography
Nie was born in Jiangjin County in Sichuan (now part of Chongqing municipality), the cosmopolitan and well-educated son of a wealthy family. In his 20s, Nie applied to the Université du Travail (University of Labour) in Charleroi, Belgium, with a scholarship from the Socialist Party, and was thus able to study science in Charleroi.

Political leanings 
Zhou Enlai spent a night in Charleroi and met with Nie. Nie agreed to join the group of Chinese students in France on a work-study program, where he studied engineering and became a protégé of Zhou Enlai.  He joined the Chinese Communist Party in 1923.

A graduate of the Soviet Red Army Military College and Whampoa Academy, Nie spent his early career first as a political officer in Whampoa's Political Department, where Zhou served as the Deputy Director, and in the Chinese Red Army.

World War II 

During the Second Sino-Japanese War, he was first assigned as the deputy division commander of the 115th division of the Eighth Route Army, with the commander being Lin Biao, and in the late 1930s he was given a field command close to Yan Xishan's Shanxi stronghold.

Civil War 
In the Chinese Civil War he commanded the Northern China Military Region, and with his deputy Xu Xiangqian, his force defeated Fu Zuoyi's forces in Tianjin near Beijing. During the Korean War, Nie took part in high level command decision making, military operations planning, and shared responsibility for war mobilization. Nie was made a Marshal of the PLA in 1955 and later ran the Chinese nuclear weapons program.

He established the Beijing Bayi School in 1947.

Chinese nuclear programme

By spring 1969, "The whole Chinese nuclear weapons program [was] under the authority of Nieh Jungh-chen [Rongzhen], the head of the Seventh Ministry for Machine Building."

Purge and rehabilitation 
He was purged during the Cultural Revolution, but was later rehabilitated and became vice chairman of the Central Military Committee, which controlled the nation's armed forces, and also became the vice chairman of the National People's Congress. He retired in 1987 and died in Beijing.

Personal life
Nie had a daughter with Zhang Ruihua (张瑞华) in 1930, who was named Nie Li. She was imprisoned with her mother by the Kuomintang in 1934 and did not see her father again until 1945. Nie Li is a lieutenant general of the People's Liberation Army and the first woman to hold that rank.

See also 
 List of officers of the People's Liberation Army
 Historical Museum of French-Chinese Friendship

References

Citations

Sources 

 People's Daily article
 Long March leaders
 US Naval War College

1899 births
1992 deaths
People's Republic of China politicians from Chongqing
Chinese military personnel of World War II
Marshals of the People's Republic of China
Chinese Communist Party politicians from Chongqing
Mayors of Beijing
People of the Chinese Civil War
Eighth Route Army generals
Communist University of the Toilers of the East alumni
Members of the 12th Politburo of the Chinese Communist Party
Members of the 11th Politburo of the Chinese Communist Party
Members of the 8th Politburo of the Chinese Communist Party
Vice Chairpersons of the National People's Congress
Burials at Babaoshan Revolutionary Cemetery